Shankara (also written as Sankara or Samkara, IAST ) can refer to:
Shiva, the Hindu god
Adi Shankara, 8th century Hindu philosopher
K. N. Shankara, Indian space scientist
Shankaracharya (Shankara acharya), a commonly used title of heads of maţhas (monasteries) in the Advaita tradition of Hindu philosophy
Shankara (raga), a raga in Indian classical music
Shankara (1991 film), a 1991 Bollywood film starring Sunny Deol
Shankara (2016 film), a Telugu film
Shankara, Purulia, a census town in West Bengal, India

See also
 Sankara (disambiguation)
 Sankar (disambiguation)
 Shankar (disambiguation)
 Rag Shankara, Rag Mala in Jogia, 1990 album by Ram Narayan